HD 181342 b is an extrasolar planet orbiting the K-type star HD 181342 approximately 394 light years away in the constellation Sagittarius.

The planet HD 181342 b is named Dopere. The name was selected in the NameExoWorlds campaign by Senegal, during the 100th anniversary of the IAU. Dopere is an expansive historical area in the north of Senegal where Belel (name of HD 181342) was located.

See also
 HD 4313 b
 HD 206610 b
 HD 180902 b
 HD 136418 b
 HD 212771 b

References

External links
 

Exoplanets discovered in 2009
Exoplanets detected by radial velocity
Sagittarius (constellation)
Exoplanets with proper names